Siak Malay or Bahase Melayu Siak is a dialect which belongs to Riau Malay dialect. Siak Malay is spoken in Siak Regency and Pekanbaru City as well as the Riau coast in general. This language is also recognized as language of unity in Pekanbaru City.

References

External links
 Malay Online Web Application with 40 Interactive Free Lessons
 Malay–English Online Dictionary (from Malay to English only) from Webster's Dictionary
 Malay–English Online Dictionary

Malay language
Siak Regency
Riau